Kirkby Overblow is a village and civil parish in the Harrogate district of North Yorkshire, England. It is situated between Wetherby and Harrogate and lies to the west of Sicklinghall and the east of Leeds Bradford International Airport.
It has a church called All Saints and a Church of England primary school affiliated with the church. Kirkby Overblow has a bus stop, but no railway station or post office.

In January 2023, The Telegraph named Kirkby Overblow one of Britain's '54 poshest villages'.

History
The first written reference to Kirkby Overblow appears in the Domesday Book, where it appears as Cherchebi. The Kirkby part of the name is a common prefix, simply meaning a settlement by a church, while Overblow is a corruption of Oreblow, a reference to the village's iron-smelting past.

Kirkby Overblow was a large ancient parish, which included the townships of Kearby with Netherby (including the hamlets of Kearby and Netherby), Rigton (which later became North Rigton), Sicklinghall and Stainburn. All these places became separate civil parishes in 1866. It was part of the West Riding of Yorkshire until 1974.

There are two pubs in Kirkby Overblow, the Shoulder of Mutton, which boasts a large beer garden, and the Star and Garter:

Climate
Climate in this area has mild differences between highs and lows, and there is adequate rainfall year-round. The Köppen Climate Classification subtype for this climate is "Cfb" (Marine West Coast Climate/Oceanic climate).

References

External links

 Village website
 Church website
 All Saints C.E. Primary School
 

Villages in North Yorkshire
Civil parishes in North Yorkshire